The Ichigkat Muja – Cordillera del Condor National Park is a protected area in Peru located in the region of Amazonas. It protects part of the Eastern Andes forests at the Cordillera del Condor mountain range.

Geography 
Cordillera del Condor National Park is located in the region of Amazonas, in northern Peru, next to the border with Ecuador. The main geographic feature is the Cordillera del Condor, a forested mountain range with moderate to steep slopes, that occupies almost 90% of the park area. The rest of the area is occupied by low hills and river terraces, being the main watercourses the Cenepa and the Santiago rivers. The highest elevation in the park is ca. 2500 m.

Climate 
Cordillera del Condor National Park has a wet tropical climate. The climograph data corresponds to the village of Coangos, in Ecuador (1576 m of elevation), just outside the national park and near the Peruvian border.

Ecology 
This national park protects part of the Eastern Cordillera Real montane forests ecoregion. These forests grow smaller as elevation increases, becoming cloud forests at high elevations and dwarf forests at mountain tops.

Flora 
Some of the plant species present in the area are: Alchornea triplinervia, Miconia spp., Piper aduncum, Iriartea deltoidea, Anthurium spp., Solanum grandiflorum, Inga spp.,  Uncaria tomentosa, Ochroma pyramidale, Minquartia guianensis, Eryngium foetidum, Perebea guianensis, Socratea exorrhiza, Cedrelinga cateniformis, Weinmannia spp., Calathea loeseneri, Palicourea spp., Oenocarpus bataua, Clethra castaneifolia, Gynerium sagittatum, Senna alata, etc.

Fauna 
Some of the birds present in the park are: the Andean cock-of-the-rock, the oilbird, the white-throated toucan, the blue-and-yellow macaw, the ornate hawk-eagle, the green hermit, etc.

Among the mammal species present in the park are: the Venezuelan red howler, the jaguar, the white-lipped peccary, the Amazon dwarf squirrel, the southern tamandua, the neotropical otter, the nine-banded armadillo, etc.

See also 
Aguaruna

References

External links 

 Profile at protectedplanet.net

National parks of Peru
Geography of Amazonas Region
Protected areas established in 2007
Tourist attractions in Amazonas Region